Sana Elmansouri is a Libyan journalist and television presenter. She was the first Arab broadcaster in Libya to broadcast programs in the Amazigh language.

She is best known for her program Abrid N Tagrawla (The Road of the Revolution)  which was broadcast on Libya Al Ahrar in 2011 during the Libyan Revolution. She also presented and produced the  program Libya Al-Nas in Arabic.  

Elmansouri was a founding member of the Libyan political party Libou, which she later left.

References 

Libyan journalists
Year of birth missing (living people)
Living people